Napoleon is an unincorporated community located in Gallatin County, Kentucky, United States.

History
Napoleon was laid out in the early 1820s and named for Napoléon Bonaparte. In the 1870s, business enterprises in Napoleon included a sawmill and gristmill, a tavern, and 3 stores. The Napoleon post office was discontinued in 1912.

References

Unincorporated communities in Gallatin County, Kentucky
Unincorporated communities in Kentucky